Nickelblödite is a rare nickel sulfate mineral with the formula Na2Ni(SO4)2·4H2O. Nickelblödite was discovered in nickel mines in Carr Boyd Rocks and Kambalda, Western Australia. The mineral is a nickel-analogue of blödite, changoite, cobaltoblödite and manganoblödite - other representatives of the blödite group.

Nickelblödite contains small admixtures of magnesium and iron.

Minerals associating with nickelblödite include violarite, morenosite, halite, pyrite, and siderite.

References

Nickel minerals
Sulfate minerals
Sodium minerals
Monoclinic minerals
Minerals in space group 14